Kirsty Knight may refer to:

 Kirsty Knight (The Bill), a fictional character on The Bill
 Kirsty Knight (Shortland Street), a fictional character on the soap opera Shortland Street